Tobias Tigjani Sana (born 11 July 1989) is a Swedish professional footballer who plays as an attacking midfielder for Allsvenskan club BK Häcken.

Club career

Qviding FIF
Sana began his professional football career in 2007–2008, playing for Qviding FIF, having spent his youth years playing for Marieholm BoIK, followed by Västra Frölunda IF, from where he was recruited to play for Qviding FIF in the Swedish Division 1 Södra and Superettan, the third and second tier of Swedish professional football. He made 28 appearances in two years, in the regular season for the club from Gothenburg, scoring twice.

IFK Göteborg
In 2009 Sana signed with IFK Göteborg making his debut in the Allsvenskan league, the top tier in Swedish football. A special clause in his contract allowed for him to return to his former club on a loan basis in 2009, before fully committing himself to IFK Göteborg. During the first half of the 2012 season Sana was a first team regular and rated among many as one of the team's best players. Despite that, the team had a disappointing season and Sana only scored two goals and made no assists.

AFC Ajax
On 1 August 2012, Sana signed a three-year deal with Dutch giants AFC Ajax. IFK Göteborg received €350,000 for the right-winger. On 19 August 2012, Sana earned his first start for AFC Ajax and immediately paid back the support from the manager by scoring his first two Eredivisie goals, and earning himself the Man of the Match award.

Malmö FF
Swedish champions Malmö FF announced on 14 January 2015 that they had signed Sana on a four-year contract.

AGF
On 8 July 2017, he signed a three-year contract with AGF, who play in the Danish Superliga.

IFK Göteborg
On 10 August 2019, Sana signed a three-year contract with IFK Göteborg and by doing so returned to the club he played for between 2009 and 2012.

At the beginning of May 2022, Sana was suspended from the club, which later led to him being forced to leave IFK Göteborg on 19 May 2022.

International career
Born to a Burkinabé father and a Swedish mother, Sana has been eligible to represent either Burkina Faso or Sweden on international level. He chose to represent Sweden, his country of birth, receiving his first call up on 2 October 2012 to play in the World Cup qualifying matches against Faroe Islands and Germany. Not making an appearance against the Faroe Islands, he made his debut for Sweden on 16 October 2012 in the match against Germany, which ended in a 4–4 tie. His second appearance for Sweden came in the friendly match against England on 14 November 2012, which ended in a 4–2 win for Sweden.

Personal life
Sana was born in Sweden, his father is from Burkina Faso, and his mother is from Sweden. Sana holds dual citizenship, but plays for the Swedish national team. Burkina Faso expressed interest in adding the young footballer to their national squad, however Sana expressed his desire to play for the Swedish national team, being the country of his birth. His younger brother Muba is also a footballer and plays for BK Häcken since 2012.

Career statistics

Club

International

Honours
Ajax
 Eredivisie: 2012–13, 2013–14
 Johan Cruyff Shield: 2013

Malmö FF
 Allsvenskan: 2016

IFK Göteborg
 Svenska Cupen: 2019–20

Individual
 Årets ärkeängel (IFK Göteborg player who have shown great loyalty to the club): 2021

References

External links
 
 

1989 births
Living people
Burkinabé footballers
Swedish footballers
Swedish expatriate footballers
Sweden international footballers
Association football midfielders
Qviding FIF players
IFK Göteborg players
AFC Ajax players
Jong Ajax players
Malmö FF players
Aarhus Gymnastikforening players
BK Häcken players
Ettan Fotboll players
Superettan players
Allsvenskan players
Eredivisie players
Eerste Divisie players
Danish Superliga players
Expatriate footballers in the Netherlands
Expatriate men's footballers in Denmark
Footballers from Gothenburg
Swedish people of Burkinabé descent
Swedish sportspeople of African descent
Sportspeople of Burkinabé descent
21st-century Burkinabé people